Hutsol is a surname. Notable people with the surname include:

Anna Hutsol (born 1984), Ukrainian activist
Yevhen Hutsol (born 1990), Ukrainian sprinter

See also
Hutson